El Cura Lorenzo ("The Priest Lorenzo") is a 1954 Argentine film and is a dramatic biographical telling of the life of the priest Lorenzo Massa who lived from 1882 to 1949.

Cast

 Ángel Magaña
 Tito Alonso
 Roberto Durán
 Lalo Malcolm
 Domingo Mania
 Nelly Meden
 Esperanza Palomero
 Bernardo Perrone
 Oscar Rovito
 Eloy Álvarez
 Ricardo Greco

References

External links
 

1954 films
1950s Spanish-language films
Argentine black-and-white films
1950s Argentine films